The 1949 Georgia Bulldogs football team was an American football team that represented the University of Georgia as a member of the Southeastern Conference (SEC) during the 1949 college football season. In their 11th year under head coach Wally Butts, the team compiled an overall record of 4–6–1, with a mark of 1–4–1 in conference play, placing 11th in the SEC.

Schedule

References

Georgia
Georgia Bulldogs football seasons
Georgia Bulldogs football